Eugen Siegfried Erich Ritter von Schobert (13 March 1883 – 12 September 1941) was a German general during World War II. He commanded the 11th Army during Operation Barbarossa, the invasion of the Soviet Union. Schobert died when his observation plane crashed in a Soviet minefield.

Early life
Schobert was born as Eugen Schobert in Würzburg in the Kingdom of Bavaria, a member state of the German Empire. He was the son of Major Karl Schobert and Anna née Michaely. Schobert entered the Royal Bavarian Army in July 1902. He served primarily in the 1st Bavarian Infantry Regiment "König" and underwent pilot training in 1911.

World War I and post-war
During World War I, Schobert remained a Bavarian infantry officer, serving the entire war on the Western Front. During the German spring offensive of 1918, he led the 3rd Battalion of the 1st Bavarian Infantry Regiment. For his actions on 23 March 1918, when he personally and successfully led his battalion in the crossing of a canal near Jussy against stiff British resistance, he was awarded the Knight's Cross of the Military Order of Max Joseph.  This was Bavaria's highest military honor, comparable to the Prussian Pour le Mérite, and conferred a patent of nobility on a recipient who was a commoner. Hence Eugen Schobert became Eugen Ritter von Schobert.

After World War I, Schobert remained in the Reichswehr and then the Wehrmacht, steadily rising up the ranks. He was Inspector of Infantry from December 1933 to September 1934 and then commanded the 17th Infantry Division from 1935 to 1936 and the 33rd Infantry Division from 1936 to 1938. He took command of the VII Army Corps (VII. Armeekorps) on 4 February 1938.

World War II and death
In September 1939, Schobert led his VII Army Corps in the invasion of Poland as part of the reserve of Army Group South. In May–June 1940, his corps, part of General Ernst Busch's Sixteenth Army of Army Group A, participated in the invasion of Belgium and Luxembourg and the Battle of France. He received the Knight's Cross of the Iron Cross for his leadership of the VII Corps in the breakthrough of the Maginot Line and the capture of Nancy and Toul.  He remained in command of the corps during preparations for the invasion of Great Britain.

In September 1940, Schobert was given command of the Eleventh Army. The army was assigned to Army Group South for Operation Barbarossa, the invasion of the Soviet Union. During combat operations in the southern Soviet Union, Schobert was killed when his Fieseler Storch observation aircraft crashed in a Soviet minefield. He was succeeded by Erich von Manstein. A German war correspondent, Leo Leixner, wrote Schobert's biography.

Family
Schobert married Alice Rieder-Gollwitzer in 1921. They had three children: two sons and one daughter. His younger son was killed in combat in 1944 while serving as a fighter pilot for the Luftwaffe.

Decorations
 Knight's Cross of the Iron Cross on 29 June 1940 as General der Infanterie and commanding general of the VII. Armeekorps

Notes

References

Citations

Bibliography

 
 Rudolf von Kramer, Otto Freiherr von Waldenfels und Dr. Günther Freiherr von Pechmann: Virtuti Pro Patria: Der königlich bayerische Militär-Max-Joseph-Orden, München 1966 (Rudolf von Kramer, Otto Freiherr von Waldenfels & Dr. Günther Freiherr von Pechmann: Virtuti Pro Patria: The Royal Bavarian Military Max Joseph Order, Munich, 1966)
 Bayerisches Kriegsarchiv: "Bayerns Goldenes Ehrenbuch", gewidmet den Inhabern der höchsten bayerischen Kriegs-auszeichnungen aus dem Weltkrieg 1914/18, München 1928 (Bavarian War Archives: "Bavaria's Golden Book of Honor", dedicated to the holders of the highest Bavarian war decorations of the World War 1914-18, Munich, 1928)

External links

1883 births
1941 deaths
Military personnel from Würzburg
German Army generals of World War II
Colonel generals of the German Army (Wehrmacht)
German Army personnel of World War I
People from the Kingdom of Bavaria
Recipients of the Knight's Cross of the Iron Cross
Knights of the Military Order of Max Joseph
Recipients of the Order of Michael the Brave, 2nd class
20th-century Freikorps personnel
Major generals of the Reichswehr
German Army personnel killed in World War II
Victims of aviation accidents or incidents in the Soviet Union
Victims of aviation accidents or incidents in Ukraine
Recipients of the clasp to the Iron Cross, 1st class
Victims of aviation accidents or incidents in 1941